Leszcze may refer to the following places:
Leszcze, Kuyavian-Pomeranian Voivodeship (north-central Poland)
Leszcze, Łódź Voivodeship (central Poland)
Leszcze, Subcarpathian Voivodeship (south-east Poland)
Leszcze, Świętokrzyskie Voivodeship (south-central Poland)
Leszcze, Gmina Kłodawa in Greater Poland Voivodeship (west-central Poland)
Leszcze, Gmina Kościelec in Greater Poland Voivodeship (west-central Poland)